David Thorpe may refer to:

 David Thorpe (artist) (born 1972), English artist
 David Thorpe, American music writer, satirist, and columnist for Something Awful
 David Thorpe (footballer) (born 1948), Australian rules footballer
 Dave Thorpe (born 1954), British comic book writer and novelist
 David Thorpe (motorcyclist), British motorcyclist
 David Thorpe (basketball), American basketball trainer and NBA analyst

See also
David Thorp (born 1947), British curator and director
David Thorp (politician), see 55th New York State Legislature